Prince George (North Cariboo Air Park) Airport, formerly , was located near Prince George, British Columbia, Canada.

See also
Prince George Airport

References

Defunct airports in British Columbia
Transport in Prince George, British Columbia